Polom is a village in the municipality of Bratunac, Bosnia and Herzegovina.

In Polom 1991 lived 436 inhabitants, of which 432 (99,08%) Serbs. In 2013, it had a population of 222 inhabitants.

References

Villages in Republika Srpska
Populated places in Bratunac